Myrtillocactus (from Latin, "blueberry cactus") is a genus of cacti. The genus is found from Mexico to Guatemala. The genus is best known with Myrtillocactus geometrizans.

The genus Myrtillocereus Fric & Kreuz. (orth. var.) has been brought into synonymy with this genus.

Description 
The largest plants in this genus can grow as tall as 5 meters. This cactus tends to flower in the summer and creates edible purple berries.

Extant Species

Cultivation 
The cuttings, which will grow quickly, from this cactus need to be taken when the temperature is high enough or the cuttings will not root. It is recommended that species should be kept dry and not under  in winter.

There are many cultivar varieties from monstrose or crested forms.

See also

Myrtgerocactus - a natural hybrid involving Myrtillocactus cochal

References 

 
Cactoideae genera
Cacti of Mexico
Flora of Guatemala